South Carolina Highway 260 (SC 260) is a  state highway in the U.S. state of South Carolina. The highway connects the Santee Dam and Manning.

Route description
SC 260 begins just north of the Santee Dam (which lies at the eastern end of Lake Marion) at a locale known as Eagle Point, within Clarendon County. It crosses over a part of the northeastern part of the lake. After it started curving to the north, it crosses over Birch Branch and part of White Oak Branch. It then passes the Clarendon County Airport – Sprott Field, which is just east of the Wyboo Golf Club. The highway crosses over Ox Swamp and Hog Branch just before entering Manning. In the city, it passes Clarendon Memorial Hospital, then has an intersection with U.S. Route 301 (US 301; Sunset Drive). About three blocks later, it meets its northern terminus, an intersection with SC 261 (West Boyce Street). Here, the roadway continues as North Mill Street.

Major intersections

See also

References

External links

SC 260 at Virginia Highways' South Carolina Highways Annex

260
Transportation in Clarendon County, South Carolina